.amsterdam is a top-level domain for the city of Amsterdam. ICANN gave the City of Amsterdam the permission to operate the domain on 24 July 2014 as a part of its new gTLD programme.  The public has been able to register .amsterdam web addresses since September 2015.
Usage of the TLD has been very limited and its introduction has been criticised for its lack of cost-effectiveness. In 2019, the number of domains registered under the TLD decreased by 9.1%.
Registration Data Access Protocol was enabled for .amsterdam domains in July 2019.

References

See also
.nl
.frl
.paris
.london

Culture in Amsterdam
Internet in the Netherlands